Chikkadu Dorakadu is a 1967 Indian Telugu-language swashbuckler film directed by B. Vittalacharya and produced by Sri Lakshmi Narayana Productions. It stars N. T. Rama Rao, Kanta Rao, Jayalalithaa and Krishna Kumari, with music composed by T. V. Raju. The film was remade in Hindi as Jay Vejay (1977).

Plot 
Once upon a time, there were three kingdoms; Malawa, Pushpapuri, and Panchalapuram, which had together hidden a secret treasure for the welfare of the people at Bhuvaseswari Peetam and hid their route map in 3 different necklaces. Generations pass; at present, the Malawa King, Dharmapala, does not have children. Taking this as an advantage, his brother-in-law Simhabala wants to grab the throne and forces Dharmapala to adopt his son Prachanda Sena. But God's wish is different; Dharmapala and his wife are blessed with twin boys. Simhabala secretly steals the children, and orders his henchmen to kill them. Due to their loyalty toward the King, the soldiers separate them by keeping a letter, which tells their identity. One child was taken care of by a burglar as Chikkadu, and another by a village lady Amaravati Dilipa. Years roll by; Chikkadu is a kind-hearted robber whose goal is to rob the rich and feed the poor. Dilipa, with his intelligent attitude, acquires riches from his subordinate kings and utilizes them for the welfare of the people.

Once Dilipa meets the Panchalapuram Princess Padmavathi, both fall in love. But the Panchalapuram King says that whoever finds the way to the Bhuvaneshwari treasure will win his daughter's hand. So, Dilipa moves to Pushpapuri for one of the necklaces. Meanwhile, Chikkadu also reaches Pushpapuri and swindles a devious dancer Manjuvani. The case is presented in the court of Queen Priyamvada, where she notices the talent of Chikkadu. Now Priyamvada wants to want to acquire the remaining two necklaces using him. So, She makes acquaintance with Chikkadu in disguise, but unfortunately, she falls for him. Here Chikkadu too takes an oath to acquire the necklaces. Dilipa, in the name of "Dorakadu", starts searching for it. At the same time, Simhabala sends his son Prachand to bring the necklace from Dharmapala. Prachanda steals the necklace and tries to kill the King when Chikkadu arrives and saves him. Chikkadu & Dorakadu scheme one above the other with many plans and tricks. Ultimately, they get the three necklaces, and they decide to move together and share the treasure. Simhabala & Prachanda also follows them. On the way, they learn their birth secret. At last, after a lot of adventures, they reach the treasure, acquire it and eliminate the baddies. Finally, the movie ends on a happy note with the marriage of Chikkadu with Priyamvada and Dorakadu with Padmavathi.

Cast 
N. T. Rama Rao as Chikkadu
Kanta Rao as Dorakadu / Dilipa Chakravarthy
Jayalalithaa as Priyamvada Devi
Krishna Kumari as Padmavathi Devi
Mikkilineni as Dharmapala Maharaju
Satyanarayana as Prachanda Sena
Thyagaraju as Simhabala
Balakrishna as Gangulu
K. V. Chalam
Jagga Rao
Vijaya Lalitha as Manjuvani
Chaya Devi as Amaravathi
Meena Kumari as Madanam
Rajeswari

Soundtrack 

Music composed by T. V. Raju.

References

External links 
 

1960s action adventure films
1960s Telugu-language films
1967 films
Films scored by T. V. Raju
Indian action adventure films
Indian fantasy action films
Indian swashbuckler films
Telugu films remade in other languages